Market fundamentalism, also known as free-market fundamentalism, is a term applied to a strong belief in the ability of unregulated laissez-faire or free-market capitalist policies to solve most economic and social problems. It is often used as pejorative by critics of said beliefs.

Origins and use 
Palagummi Sainath believes Jeremy Seabrook, a journalist and campaigner, first used the term. The term was used by Jonathan Benthall in an Anthropology Today editorial in 1991 and by John Langmore and John Quiggin in their 1994 book Work for All.

According to economist John Quiggin, the standard features of economic fundamentalist rhetoric are dogmatic assertions combined with the claim that anyone who holds contrary views is not a real economist. However, Kozul-Wright states in his book The Resistible Rise of Market Fundamentalism that the "ineluctability of market forces" neoliberals and conservative politicians tend to stress and their confidence on a chosen policy rest on a "mixture of implicit and hidden assumptions, myths about the history of their own countries' economic development, and special interests camouflaged in their rhetoric of general good". The sociologists Fred L. Block and Margaret Somers use the label "because the term conveys the quasi-religious certainty expressed by contemporary advocates of market self-regulation".

Joseph Stiglitz used the term in his autobiographical essay in acceptance of Nobel Memorial Prize in Economic Sciences to criticize some International Monetary Fund policies, arguing: "More broadly, the IMF was advocating a set of policies which is generally referred to alternatively as the Washington consensus, the neo-liberal doctrines, or market fundamentalism, based on an incorrect understanding of economic theory and (what I viewed) as an inadequate interpretation of the historical data".

Critics of laissez-faire policies have used the term to denote what they perceive as a misguided belief or deliberate deception that capitalist free markets provide the greatest possible equity and prosperity, or the view that any interference with the market process decreases social well-being. Users of the term include adherents of interventionist, mixed economy and protectionist positions as well as billionaires such as George Soros; economists such as Nobel Laureates Joseph Stiglitz and Paul Krugman; and Cornell University historian Edward E. Baptist. Soros suggests that market fundamentalism includes the belief that the best interests in a given society are achieved by allowing its participants to pursue their own financial self-interest with no restraint or regulatory oversight.

Critics claim that in modern society with worldwide conglomerates, or even merely large companies, the individual has no protection against fraud nor harm caused by products that maximize income by imposing externalities on the individual consumer as well as society. Historian Edward E. Baptist contends that "unrestrained domination of market forces can sometimes amplify existing forms of oppression into something more horrific" such as slavery and that "market fundamentalism doesn't always provide the best solution for every economic or social problem".

See also

References

Bibliography and further reading 
 
 Camerer, C. (1995): Individual Decision Making, in: Kagel, J.H. & Roth, A.E. (Eds.): Handbook of Experimental Economics, Princeton, Princeton University Press, 587–703. 
 Cox, Harvey (2016). The Market as God. Harvard University Press. 
 French-Davis, Ricardo. Reforming Latin America's Economies: After Market Fundamentalism. Palgrave Macmillan, 2006.  
  
 Kozul-Wright, Richard. The Resistible Rise of Market Fundamentalism: The Struggle for Economic Development in a Global Economy. United Nations Conference on Trade and Development (UNCTAD), London: ZedBooks Ltd., 2007.

External links 

 Longview Institute page on Market Fundamentalism
 The free market is an impossible utopia. The Washington Post, July 18, 2014.

Capitalism
Economic ideologies
Economic liberalism
Economic problems
Ideologies of capitalism
Neoliberalism
Management theory
Political terminology